Bethe, also spelled Betha, is the name of an ancient minor German noble family 
originating from the region of Pomerelia in Prussia. 
The first person known to hold the name was Caspar von Bethe, a knight of the Teutonic Order who led the Teutonic takeover of Danzig. After the conquest, he was granted lordship of Conitz for his service. In later centuries, his descendants in Austria and Brandenburg-Prussia went on to establish a noble lineage, later entitled as Ritter von Betha in the Prussian and Austrian nobility.

It is also a given name which may refer to:

 Albrecht Bethe (1872–1954), German physiologist and father of Hans Bethe
 Erich Bethe (1863–1940), German philologist
 Hans Bethe (1906–2005), German-American nuclear physicist
 Kitty Cooper (born 1960), American bridge player also known as Kitty Bethe
 Mason Betha (born 1975), American minister and rapper
 Bethe Correia (born 1983), Brazilian mixed martial artist
 Ernst Ludwig von Betha, Austrian nobleman and grandson of Angelo Soliman

See also
 
 
 Bethel (disambiguation)
 Prussian nobility